Animated Tales of the World is a 2001 animated series that aired on HBO and S4C. It was produced by Children's Television Trust International and Christmas Films for S4C and Channel 4. The series is an anthology serie adapting a unique story from different countries around the world, with each episode having a different art and animation style. It has the largest co-production in the history of broadcast television, involving 39 countries.

Episodes

Season 1 (2001)
 01 – Green Man of Knowledge, A Tale from Scotland – 11 February 2001
 02 – Fionn, A Tale from Ireland – 11 February 2001
 03 – Ewen Conger, A Tale from France – 11 March 2001
 04 – The Two Brothers, A Tale from Russia – 11 March 2001
 05 – Raven Steals the Daylight, A Tale from Alaska – 18 March 2001
 06 – Tree with the Golden Apples, A Tale from Holland – 18 March 2001

Season 2 (2002)
 01 – The Magic Paintbrush (based on The Magic Paintbrush by Hong Xuntao), A Tale from China – 5 January 2002
 02 – Cap O'Rushes, A Tale from England – 15 January 2002
 03 – Podna and Podni, A Tale from Pakistan – 15 January 2002
 04 – The Three Sisters Who Fell Into the Mountain, A Tale from Norway – 16 January 2002
 05 – Flower of Fern, A Tale from Poland – 16 January 2002
 06 – Bad Baby Amy, A Tale from Australia – 23 January 2002
 07 – Shepherdess and the Chimney Sweep, A Tale from Denmark – 23 January 2002
 08 – Redhill, A Tale from Singapore – 29 January 2002
 09 – Timoon and the Narwhal, A Tale from Canada – 31 January 2002
 10 – The Enchanted Lion, A Tale from Germany – 31 January 2002
 11 – King March, A Tale from Wales – 5 February 2002
 12 – Aunt Tiger, A Tale from Taiwan – 6 February 2002
 13 – The Myth of Persephone, A Tale from Greece – 10 February 2002
 14 – Shepherd Boy Tumur, A Tale from Mongolia – 10 February 2002
 15 – The Crown and Sceptre, A Tale from Arabia – 12 February 2002
 16 – How the Tortoise Won Respect, A Tale from South Africa – 14 February 2002
 17 – John Henry: The Steel Driving Man, A Tale from the United States of America – 18 February 2002
 18 – King Solomon and the Bee, A Tale from Israel (Originally complied by Haim Nachman Bialik in And It Came To Pass),– 20 February 2002
 19 – The Tyrant and the Child, A Tale from Burkina Faso – 25 November 2002
 20 – The Chief and the Carpenter, A Tale from the Caribbean – 25 December 2002

Season 3 (2004)
 01 – The Shoemaker's Son, A Tale from Armenia – 3 November 2003
 02 – The Magic Gourd, A Tale from China – 3 November 2003
 03 – Ummemo the Echo, A Tale from South Africa – 3 November 2003
 04 – The Story of Flax, A Tale from Poland – 3 November 2003
 05 – Merlin and the Dragons, A Tale from Wales – 3 November 2003
 06 – The Manairons, A Tale from Catalonia – 3 November 2003
 07 – Frau Holle, A Tale from Germany – 3 November 2003
 08 – The Multi-Colored Jackal, A Tale from India – 3 November 2003
 09 – Umuninyan, A Tale from Namibia – 3 November 2003
 10 – The Loch Ness Kelpie Gaelic, A Tale from Scotland – 3 November 2003
 11 – Crossing the Snow, A Tale from Japan – 3 November 2003
 12 – The Raspberry Worm, A Tale from Finland – 3 November 2003
 13 – The Boy who had No Story, A Tale from Ireland – 3 November 2003

Broadcast

United States
HBO (11 February 2001 – 3 November 2003)
HBO Family (August 26, 2001 - 2005) (shown as part of the block Magnet)

United Kingdom 
Channel 4 (2001–2003) (shown as part of Book Box)

Spain 
K3 (2007–2009)
Super3 (2004–2009)

Singapore
Kids Central

Hong Kong
TVB Jade

Ireland
RTÉ (English dub)
TG4 (Irish dub)

Wales
S4C (2001–2003) (dubbed in Welsh)

Namibia
NBC

Australia
SBS

South Africa
SABC2

France
La Cinquième

Scotland
BBC Alba  (Scottish dub)

Burkina Faso
Télévision Nationale du Burkina Faso

Germany
ZDF (German dub)
BFBS (English dub)

Finland
YLE TV2

Poland
TVP1

China
CCTV

Hungary
M2
RTL Klub

Nauru
NTV

Pakistan
PTV

Mexico
XEW-TDT

Canada
CBC
TFO

Latin America
Discovery Kids

Netherlands
KRO

New Zealand
TVNZ

Awards 
It won two Primetime Emmy Awards in 2001, for Outstanding Individual Achievement in Animation and Outstanding Voice-Over Performance for Peter Macon. At the 2001 British Academy Children's Awards, the episode "Aunt Tiger" won the Animation category while the episodes "Chief and the Carpenter" and "The Tyrant and the Child" received nominations for the International category. The following year, the episode "Bad Baby Amy" was nominated for the Animation award.

References

External links
Animated Tales of the World at the Internet Movie Database

2001 American television series debuts
2003 American television series endings
2000s American animated television series
2000s American anthology television series
2001 British television series debuts
2003 British television series endings
2000s British animated television series
2000s British anthology television series
American children's animated action television series
American children's animated adventure television series
American children's animated anthology television series
American children's animated fantasy television series
British children's animated action television series
British children's animated adventure television series
British children's animated anthology television series
British children's animated fantasy television series
English-language television shows
HBO original programming
Mythology in popular culture